Baltazar Leguizamón (born August 11, 2000) is an Argentine racing driver who competes in open wheel racing as well as part-time in the NASCAR Xfinity Series, driving for MBM Motorsports. He is the son of Alejandro Leguizamón, businessman and former racing driver.

Racing career

On October 30, 2022, Corazón de F1 reported that Leguizamón had obtained a license to drive NASCAR in the Xfinity Series and he could attempt some of the road course races in 2023. He would become the first driver from Argentina to compete in the series. On December 23, MBM Motorsports announced that Leguizamón would drive for the team in the race at Circuit of the Americas in 2023 once they find a sponsor for him.

Racing record

Career summary

* Season still in progress.

NASCAR
(key) (Bold – Pole position awarded by qualifying time. Italics – Pole position earned by points standings or practice time. * – Most laps led.)

Xfinity Series

 Season still in progress 
 Ineligible for series points

References

External links
 
 

2000 births
Living people
Argentine racing drivers
People from Arrecifes
Formula Regional Americas Championship drivers
Sportspeople from Buenos Aires Province
Formula Renault Argentina drivers
NASCAR drivers

United States F4 Championship drivers
NACAM F4 Championship drivers